Vinay Kumar, professionally credited as Vinay Forrt is an Indian film and stage actor. He hails from Fort Kochi, Kerala and is a theatre activist with more than a decade's worth of experience in the theatrical field as well as a postgraduate in acting from Film and Television Institute of India, Pune, India. He made his cinematic debut in the Malayalam film Ritu (2009).

Early life and education

Vinay Forrt was born in Fort Kochi, Kerala, to M. V. Mani and Sujatha. His real name is Vinay Kumar, and he changed his name as a tribute to his birthplace. He has a sister, Suma, and a brother, Syam. He was educated at St John De Britto Anglo-Indian High School, Fort Kochi and Aquinas College Edacochin  .
Before entering the movie industry, he worked at a restaurant, a coffee shop, medical shop and a call center. During his first year while studying for his degree , he joined Lokadharmi Theater and became active in their plays. Later, he dropped degree to join the Film and Television Institute of India in Pune, India, and became a postgraduate in acting. He has been an ardent follower of Indian Theater for nearly a decade, as an actor and an activist. Vinay received the National Scholarship from the Government of India for the Best Senior Theatre Actor (2004 - 2006). He is a contemporary dancer as well.

Acting career

While pursuing his post-graduation at FTII, Pune, he was informed by an FTII aspirant, Dheeraj Nandakumar about the ongoing Audition for Shyamaprasads movie (Ritu) while he contacted Vinay for help regarding selection for the acting course at FTII . This turned out to be the turning point for Vinay as he finally got chosen by Shyamaprasad to play a role in his film Ritu (2009). Vinay Fort debuted in Shyamaprasad's Ritu (2009) in a small role as a gay, but one which earned him recognition

He costarred in The Blueberry Hunt (2011), an English film by Anup Kurian with Naseeruddin Shah in the lead. He played a notabe role in Navagatharkku Swagatham (2012). But the film was a failure at box office. Vinay went on to play minor roles in several movies. He was noted for his role as Nanmayil Suran in Shutter (2012). The film was a critical and commercial success and was screened at various International film festivals. Vinay played a notable supporting role in the 2014 thriller 7th Day.

Vinay finally got his breakthrough by portraying Vimal Sir in Alphonse Putharen's Premam. This role with a comic shade earned him wide recognition and some of his dialogues from the movie eventually developed a cult following. He played a lead role in the 2015 comedy thriller Urumbukal Urangarilla which received positive and mixed reviews. Vinay went on to play some notable roles in movies such as Kohinoor (2015) Kammatti Paadam, Kismath (2016) and God Say (2017). He played a lead role in Hello Namasthe (2016). But it was a failure at box office. He had a major supportive role in Georgettans Pooram and Role Models, both released in 2017.

Vinay did the lead role in Thamasha (2019). He portrayed Srinivasan, a Malayalam professor with a balding pate, who is unable to find a suitable woman to marry. Some critics reviewed it as one of the best performance by him. Vinay played a lead role in the satire Paapam Cheyyathavar Kalleriyatte (2020). The movie generally received positive reviews from critics. His comic role as Kripesh/Akash Menon in Mohan Kumar Fans (2021) was well appreciated. Vinay's performance as David Chistudas, a friend-turned-foe of the protagonist in Mahesh Narayanan's Malik (2021) received wide appreciation from critics. This role is considered by many as one of his career best performance.

Personal life
He married his longtime girlfriend Soumya Ravi, a research student, on 6 December 2014 at Guruvayoor. The couple have a son.

Filmography

Films

Television

Awards

References

External links
 

Indian male film actors
Male actors from Kochi
Living people
Male actors in Malayalam cinema
21st-century Indian male actors
Male actors in Malayalam television
Year of birth missing (living people)